Sautso, also referred as Alta Canyon, is a canyon (valley) along the river Altaelva in Troms og Finnmark county, Norway. The valley is located in Alta Municipality, just north of the border with Kautokeino Municipality. The canyon begins just downstream (north) from the Alta Power Station. The river flows down from the Finnmarksvidda plateau into the canyon, so the walls of the canyon clearly show many sedimentary layers.

References

Canyons and gorges of Norway
Alta, Norway
Landforms of Troms og Finnmark